|}

The Navigation Stakes is a Listed flat horse race in Ireland open to thoroughbreds aged three years or older. It is run at Cork over a distance of 1 mile and 100 yards (1,701 metres), and it is scheduled to take place each year in late September or early October.

The race was first run in 2006.

Records
Most successful horse (3 Wins):
 Brendan Brackan - (2015,2016,2017) 

Leading jockey (2 wins):
 Niall McCullagh – 	Farinelli (2006), Rich Coast (2013)
 Billy Lee -  Jalmira (2007), Up Helly Aa (2019) 
 Wayne Lordan – Ask Jack (2010), Ship of Dreams (2018)
 Gary Carroll -  Brendan Brackan (2015,2016)

Leading trainer (3 wins):
 Ger Lyons – Brendan Brackan (2015,2016,2017)  Joseph O'Brien -  Ship of Dreams (2018), Queenship (2021), Statement(2022) ''

Winners

See also
 Horse racing in Ireland
 List of Irish flat horse races

References
Racing Post:

Flat races in Ireland
Open mile category horse races
Cork Racecourse
2006 establishments in Ireland
Recurring sporting events established in 2006